Thomas Comber may refer to:

 Thomas Comber (dean of Carlisle) (1575–1654)
 Thomas Comber (dean of Durham) (1645–1699)
 Thomas J. Comber, Baptist missionary from England